Fern School is a historic school in the town of Fern, Wisconsin. Fern School was built in the Colonial Revival style using clapboard. The school was added to the National Register of Historic Places on March 20, 1981.

References

School buildings on the National Register of Historic Places in Wisconsin
School buildings completed in 1921
Buildings and structures in Florence County, Wisconsin
Colonial Revival architecture in Wisconsin
National Register of Historic Places in Florence County, Wisconsin
1921 establishments in Wisconsin